The RPG-7 is a portable, reusable, unguided, shoulder-launched, anti-tank, rocket-propelled grenade launcher. The RPG-7 and its predecessor, the RPG-2, were designed by the Soviet Union, and are now manufactured by the Russian company Bazalt. The weapon has the GRAU index (Russian armed forces index) 6G3.

The ruggedness, simplicity, low cost, and effectiveness of the RPG-7 has made it the most widely used anti-armor weapon in the world. Currently around 40 countries use the weapon; it is manufactured in several variants by nine countries. It is popular with irregular and guerrilla forces.

Widely produced, the most commonly seen major variations are the RPG-7D (десантник – desantnik – paratrooper) model, which can be broken into two parts for easier carrying; and the lighter Chinese Type 69 RPG. DIO of Iran manufactures RPG-7s with olive green handguards, H&K pistol grips, and a Commando variant.

The RPG-7 was first delivered to the Soviet Army in 1961 and deployed at squad level. It replaced the RPG-2, having clearly out-performed the intermediate RPG-4 design during testing. The current model produced by the Russian Federation is the RPG-7V2, capable of firing standard and dual high-explosive anti-tank (HEAT) rounds, high explosive/fragmentation, and thermobaric warheads (see below), with a UP-7V sighting device fitted (used in tandem with the standard 2.7× PGO-7 optical sight) to allow the use of extended range ammunition. The RPG-7D3 is the equivalent paratrooper model. Both the RPG-7V2 and RPG-7D3 were adopted by the Russian Ground Forces in 2001.

Description

The launcher is reloadable and based around a steel tube, 40 millimetres in diameter, 950 millimetres long, and weighing 7 kilograms. The middle of the tube is wood wrapped to protect the user from heat and the end is flared. Sighting is usually optical with a back-up iron sight, and passive infra-red and night sights are also available. The launchers designated RPG-7N1 and RPG-7DN1 can thus mount the multi-purpose night vision scope 1PN51 and the launchers designated RPG-7N2 and RPG-7DN2 can mount the multi-purpose night vision scope 1PN58.

As with similar weapons, the grenade protrudes from the launch tubes. It is 40–105 millimetres in diameter and weighs between 2.0 and 4.5 kilograms. It is launched by a gunpowder booster charge, giving it an initial speed of 115 metres per second, and creating a cloud of light grey-blue smoke that can give away the position of the shooter. The rocket motor ignites after 10 metres and sustains flight out to 500 metres at a maximum velocity of 295 metres per second. The grenade is stabilized by two sets of fins that deploy in-flight: one large set on the stabilizer pipe to maintain direction and a smaller rear set to induce rotation. The grenade can fly up to 1,100 metres; the fuze sets the maximum range, usually 920 metres.

Propulsion system

According to the United States Army Training and Doctrine Command (TRADOC) Bulletin 3u (1977) Soviet RPG-7 Antitank Grenade Launcher—Capabilities and Countermeasures, the RPG-7 munition has two sections: a "booster" section and a "warhead and sustainer motor" section. These must be assembled into the ready-to-use grenade. The TRADOC bulletin provides anecdotal commentary that the RPG-7 has been fired from within buildings, which agrees with the two-stage design. It is stated that only a 2-metre standoff to a rear obstruction is needed for use inside rooms or fortifications. The fins not only provide drag stabilization, but are designed to impart a slow rotation to the grenade.

Due to the configuration of the RPG-7 sustainer/warhead section, it responds counter-intuitively to crosswinds. A crosswind will tend to exert pressure on the stabilizing fins, causing the projectile to turn into the wind (see Weathervane effect). While the rocket motor is still burning, this will cause the flight path to curve into the wind. The TRADOC bulletin explains aiming difficulties for more distant moving targets in crosswinds at some length.

Ammunition

The RPG-7 can fire a variety of warheads for anti-armor (HEAT, PG-Protivotankovaya Granata) or anti-personnel (HE, OG-Oskolochnaya Granata) purposes, usually fitting with an impact (PIBD) and a 4.5 second fuze. Armor penetration is warhead dependent and ranges from 30 to 60 centimetres of RHA; one warhead, the PG-7VR, is a 'tandem charge' device, used to defeat reactive armor with a single shot.

Current production ammunition for the RPG-7V2 consists of four main types:
 PG-7VL [c.1977] Improved 93 mm HEAT warhead effective against most vehicles and fortified targets.
 PG-7VR [c.1988] Tandem charge warhead designed to penetrate up to 750 mm rolled homogeneous armour equivalence of explosive reactive armor and the conventional armor underneath. It has a range of 200 m.
 TBG-7V Tanin [c.1988] 105 mm Thermobaric warhead for anti-personnel and urban warfare.
 OG-7V [c.1999] 40 mm Fragmentation warhead for anti-personnel warfare. Has no sustainer motor.

Other warhead variants include:
 PG-7V [c.1961] Baseline 85 mm HEAT warhead capable of penetrating 260 mm RHA.
 PG-7VM [c.1969] Improved 70 mm HEAT warhead capable of penetrating 300 mm RHA.
 PG-7VS [c.1972] Improved 73 mm HEAT warhead capable of penetrating 400 mm RHA.
 PG-7VS1 [c.mid-1970s] Cheaper PG-7VS version capable of penetrating 360 mm RHA.
 GSh-7VT [c.2013] Anti-bunker warhead with cylindrical follow-through blast-fragmentation munition followed by explosively formed penetrator.
 OGi-7MA [unknown] Anti-personnel fragmentation munition developed for the Bulgarian ATGL-L. improved equivalent to the Soviet OG-7V. Compatible with RPG-7.

Specifications
Manufacturer specifications for the RPG-7V1.

Hit probabilities

History of use
The RPG-7 was first used in 1967 by Egypt during the Six-Day War, and by the Viet Cong during the Vietnam War, but it did not see widespread usage in Vietnam until the following year.

The RPG-7 was used by the Provisional Irish Republican Army in Northern Ireland from 1969 to 2005, most notably in Lurgan, County Armagh, where it was used against British Army observation posts and the towering military base at Kitchen Hill in the town. The IRA also used them in Catholic areas of West Belfast against British Army armoured personnel carriers and Army forward operating bases (FOB). Beechmount Avenue in Belfast became known as "RPG Avenue" after attacks on British troops.

In Mogadishu, Somalia, RPG-7s were used to down two U.S. Army Black Hawk helicopters in 1993.

During the first and second Chechen wars, Chechens used RPG-7 which they had captured from Soviet bases and used them against Russian armored columns. During the first war, Russians may have lost 100 tanks and 250 AFVs in Grozny. The Chechens were able to knock out T-90s with three or four RPG-7 hits. Against T-90s with Explosive Reactive Armor, the Chechens fired an RPG in close range (within 50m) to detonate the armor and then followed this with RPG hits on the now exposed point of the tank, also from close range. The RPG-7 was also effective against Armoured fighting vehicles (AFVs), buildings and personnel.

The PG-7VR has been used by Iraqi insurgents. On 28 August 2003, it achieved a mobility kill against an American M1 Abrams hitting the left side hull next to the forward section of the engine compartment.

During the War in Afghanistan (2001–2021), several M1A2 Abrams were temporarily disabled by RPG-7 hits.

Users

 : 5,000 units that are locally produced as the model TIP-57.
 
 
 
 
 
 
 : Chinese Type 69 RPG variant used by Bangladesh Army.
 
 
 
 
 : Produced locally by Arsenal Corporation as ATGL-L. 
 
 
 
 
 
 
 : Type 69 reverse-engineered copy.
 
 
 
 
 
 
 
 : Locally produced without license as PG-7 by the Sakr Factory for Developed Industries.
 
 
 
 
 : Modified version "RPG-7D" locally produced by STC Delta.
 
 
 
 
 
 : Used by the marine corps.
 . Produced locally as Sageg.
 . Produced locally as Al-Nassira from the 1980s by Ba'athist Iraq.
 : Large stocks held as secondary ATW. Rounds produced locally.
 
 
 
 
 
 
 
 : Used by both the Liberian Army and guerrilla factions in the Liberian Civil Wars.
  (used by both sides in the Libyan Civil War)
 
 : Bulgarian ATGL-L versions are purchased and used since the early 2000s
 
 
 
 
 : Produced locally.
 
 
 
 : Non state-users.
 : Clones made as MA-10.
 
 : Produced under license by the Defence Industries Corporation of Nigeria
 
 
  
 : Used by the Pakistan Army and paramilitary forces. RPG-7V version made under license by Pakistan Machine Tool Factory.
 
 : The army has three different variants: 250 ATGL-L2 from Bulgaria, 30 Type 69 from China, and 744 RPG-7V2 from Russia.
 : Produced RPG-7 and RPG-7W variants.
 
 : Produced locally by SC Carfil SA from Brașov as AG-7 (Romanian: Aruncătorul de Grenade 7, Grenade Launcher 7).
 
 
 : Used by the Polisario Front.
 
 : Saudi army
 
 : Made by PPT Namenska.
 
 
 
 : South African National Defence Force.
 
 : South Sudan Democratic Movement, Sudan Liberation Movement/Army, South Sudan Defence Forces, Sudan People's Liberation Army used RPG-7, Type 69s and Iranian-made RPGs.
 
 : Made by Military Industry Corporation as the Sinar.
 : Used by the Military of Suriname.
  (used by all sides in the Syrian civil war)
 : Produced locally.
 
 
 : Produced locally.
 : Produced locally.
 : Produced locally and in service with governmental users.
 : Produced locally.
 
 : Locally produced and designated as RPG7V-VN or B-41 anti-tank gun.

Non-state users
  Al Qaeda
 
 
 
 
 
  Kurdistan Workers' Party
  Ulster Volunteer Force
  Provisional IRA

Former users

Conflicts

1960s
 Vietnam War (1955–1975): First used in 1967.
 Portuguese Colonial War (1961–1974)
 Rhodesian Bush War (1964–1979)
 South African Border War (1966–1990)
 Six Day War (1967)
 War of Attrition (1967–1970)
 The Troubles

1970s
 Yom Kippur War (1973)
 Lebanese Civil War (1975–1990)
 Western Sahara War (1975–1991)
 Kurdish–Turkish conflict (1978–present)
 Sino-Vietnamese War (1979)
 Soviet–Afghan War (1979–1989)

1980s
 Iran–Iraq War (1980–1988)
 First Nagorno-Karabakh War
 1982 Lebanon War
 First Liberian Civil War (1989–1997)

1990s
 Gulf War (1990–1991)
 Somali Civil War (1991–present)
 Yugoslav Wars (1991–2001)
 First Chechen War (1994–1996)
 Second Congo War (1998–2003)
 Second Liberian Civil War (1999–2003)
 Second Chechen War (1999–2009)

2000s
 War in Darfur (2004–present)
 War in Afghanistan (2001–2021)
 Iraq War (2003–2011)

2010s
 Libyan Civil War (2011)
 Syrian Civil War (2011–present)
 Mali War (2012–present)
 War in Iraq (2013–2017)
 Yemeni Civil War (2014–present)
 Insurgency in Northern Chad
 Russo-Ukrainian War (2014–present)

2020s
 2020 Nagorno-Karabakh War
 2022 Russian invasion of Ukraine

See also
 RPG-2
 Panzerfaust
 Panzerfaust 2
 Panzerfaust 3
 PSRL-1

References

Bibliography

External links

 Manufacturer's site
 Countering the RPG threat
 How Stuff Works – RPG(7)
 RPG-7 analysis and user´s manual
 Technical data, instructional images and diagrams of the RPG-7 
 Ultimate Weapons Rpg 7 Military Channel on YouTube
 

Rocket-propelled grenade launchers of the Soviet Union
Weapons and ammunition introduced in 1961
Bazalt products
Modern thermobaric weapons of Russia
Modern incendiary weapons of Russia
Gun-mortars
Military equipment introduced in the 1960s